Mashhad Rizeh (also Romanized as Mashhad Rīzeh; also known as Mashad-i-Riza and Meshed-i-Riza) is a city in Miyan Velayat District, Taybad County, Razavi Khorasan Province, Iran. At the 2006 census, its population was 8,307, in 1,808 families.
the real name of this town is rizeh which originates from  the word rizeh(رزه)which means vine so the reason of this name is the existence of vast vineyards in Rizeh. Rizeh has been one of the old village of Bakharz and Taybad county ( later became part of Taybad county). according to public's beliefs, rizeh has been  actually remnants of big town (Rezavan) which after recession of its prime has been turned to a village and rizeh emanates from the name of this town(Rezvan). needles to say that the town had been surrounded by a wall with the name of Shahrband(surrounded town), which indicates the accuracy of this remark. in 2006, out of the mixture of rizeh and mashhad rizeh, town of mashhadrizeh was developed.

References 

Populated places in Taybad County
Cities in Razavi Khorasan Province